Clair A. Francomano is an American medical geneticist and academic specializing in Ehlers–Danlos syndromes. She is Professor of Medical and Molecular Genetics at Indiana University.

Early life, education and training

Clair Ann Francomano was born to Mrs. and Charles J. Francomano, a general practitioner. She attended Roosevelt High School in Yonkers, New York and participated in programs at the National Institutes of Health and the Jackson Laboratory in Bar Harbor, Maine as a high school student. She earned her undergraduate degree from Yale College in 1976, having returned as an undergraduate to the Jackson Laboratory to study cancer genetics on a National Science Foundation grant in 1973. She then earned her M.D. from Johns Hopkins School of Medicine in 1980. She trained at Hopkins in internal medicine and medical genetics.

Career
Francomano joined the faculty of Johns Hopkins University in 1984.  In 1994, she moved to the National Institutes of Health to become chief of the Medical Genetics Branch at the National Human Genome Research Institute; from 1996 to 2001 she was its clinical director. From 2001 to 2005 she was Chief of the Human Genetics and Integrative Medicine Section in the Laboratory of Genetics, National Institute on Aging. While at NIH, she launched a natural history study of Ehlers–Danlos syndromes that lasted for more than two decades. She also worked on the Human Genome Project.

In 2005, Francomano became director of adult genetics for the Harvey Institute of Human Genetics of the Greater Baltimore Medical Center. She later became director of its Ehlers-Danlos National Foundation Center for Clinical Care and Research.

Francomano has been a member of the Steering Committee for the International Consortium on the Ehlers-Danlos Syndromes and Related Conditions. Since 2016, she has chaired the Consortium’s Committee on Classical Ehlers-Danlos Syndrome.

In 2019 she joined Indiana University as professor of medical and molecular genetics at the School of Medicine and director of the Residency Training Program in Genetics.

Notable publications

References

People from Yonkers, New York
Yale College alumni
Johns Hopkins University faculty
Johns Hopkins School of Medicine alumni
Indiana University faculty
American women geneticists
American geneticists
Year of birth missing (living people)
Living people
21st-century American women scientists
21st-century American biologists
Scientists from New York (state)